George Edward Page (13 June 1905 – 4 September 1974) was an Australian rules footballer who played with Essendon in the Victorian Football League (VFL).

Family
The son of John William Page (1864-1949), and Annie Elizabeth Page (1863-1906), née Buchanan, George Edward Page was born at Elsternwick, Victoria on 13 June 1905.

He married Dorothy Thelma Wessel (1908-1983) in 1932.

Football
He was granted a clearance from the Elsternwick Football Club in the Metropolitan Amateur Football Association (MAFA) to Essendon on 30 April 1926.

Military service
Page later served in the Australian Army in the Middle East during World War II.

Death
He died at East Malvern on 4 September 1974.

Notes

References
 
 Maplestone, M., Flying Higher: History of the Essendon Football Club 1872–1996, Essendon Football Club, (Melbourne), 1996. 
 
 B883, VX75965: World War Two Service Record: Private George Edward Page (VX75965), National Archives of Australia.

External links 
		

1905 births
1974 deaths
Australian rules footballers from Melbourne
Essendon Football Club players
People from Elsternwick, Victoria
Australian Army personnel of World War II
Military personnel from Melbourne